The Starwood Festival is a seven-day Neo-Pagan, New Age, multi-cultural and world music festival, taking place every July in the United States. The Starwood Festival is a camping event which holds workshops on a variety of subjects. There are also live musical performances, rituals, bonfires, multimedia presentations and social activities. It is a clothing optional event, and skyclad attendance is common.

History 
The Starwood Festival was founded in 1981 by the Chameleon Club, a recognized student organization at Case Western Reserve University, which later founded the Association for Consciousness Exploration (ACE). It has been operated by ACE since 1983 under its co-directors, Jeff Rosenbaum and Joe Rothenberg. It featured entertainment, public ceremonies, and classes on subjects such as sensory isolation, Kirlian photography, Neopaganism, shamanism, Wicca, holistic health, tarot divination, Thelema, and past life regression. Among the first guest speakers and entertainers were Jim Alan and Selena Fox (founders of Circle Sanctuary), Raymond Buckland, Lee Bryan Grotte (Foundation for Research in Medical Botany), and music by Chameleon and The Ancient Illuminated Seers of Bavaria.

The first Starwood was held July 24–26, 1981 at Coopers Lake Campground, the same site as the Society for Creative Anachronism's Pennsic War, in Slippery Rock, PA. From 1982 through 1985 it was held at Devil's Den Park in New Philadelphia, OH, a former state park run by Whispering Winds Nudist Camp. In 1986 and 1987 it was held at Bear Creek Amphitheatre (part of Bear Creek Resort Ranch KOA) in East Sparta, OH, and at Echo Hills Ski Resort in Logan, OH (on the Buckeye Trail) in 1988 and 1989. The event moved to Brushwood Folklore Center, a private campground in Sherman, New York from 1990 through 2009. Since 2010, Starwood has been held at Wisteria Campground in Pomeroy, Ohio.

The event began as a weekend festival, and grew over the years to a seven-day event. Attendance has grown from 185 in the first year to peak at around 1800 people in 2002, and has stayed between 1400 and 1600 since then. Since 1982, Starwood has been a clothing optional event, and skyclad attendance is common.

Activities 
Starwood offers approximately 150 workshops, on topics including alternative lifestyles, political & spiritual activism, spiritual traditions,  consciousness-altering technologies and substances (such as biofeedback, sensory-isolation, mind machines, entheogenic and other mind-altering substances), martial arts & movement systems, history, magic, folklore, art & music, metaphysics and environmental issues.

There are classes on the drumming and dancing styles of Africa, South America, Ireland, the Middle East and elsewhere. All-night drummers’ bonfires are held each night of the event in at least two locations: the "Paw Paw Patch" for larger drums such as djembes, and the "DidgeDome" for smaller drums such as bongos and tablas, accompanied by didgeridoos and quieter instruments. There are concerts held every lunchtime, dinnertime, and evening, and all-night multi-media enhanced parties in an inflatable structure called the "PufferDome" and in an adjacent area called the "G-Spot". Starwood provides child care and children's classes and programs in a playground area called "Kids' Village", and a schedule of classes and activities for teenagers. There are several areas devoted to multi-cultural ceremonies and rituals, and a non-Native sweat lodge. Friday night features a multi-media presentation, (often including fireworks, lasers, fire dancing, and synchronized music), and on the final night a torchlight procession leads to a huge bonfire.

People 
Starwood is attended by people of all ages. Followers of diverse beliefs attend Starwood, including Wiccans, neo-druids, chaos magicians, Ásatrúar, ceremonial magicians, Buddhists, Setians and those representing a variety of New Age spiritualities. According to the event organizers, the festival is designed for members of all spiritual paths to share their customs and beliefs. Some specific groups whose members regularly appear at and attend Starwood include the Church of All Worlds (CAW), the Church of the SubGenius, the Neo-Druidic group Ar nDraiocht Fein (ADF), and various Neopagan Covens and organizations.

Featured speakers 

 Isaac Bonewits
 Raymond Buckland
 Dagmar Braun Celeste
 Phyllis Curott
 LaSara Firefox
 Selena Fox
 Gavin Frost
 Yvonne Frost
 Stephen Gaskin
 Jesse Wolf Hardin
 Ellen Evert Hopman
 Anodea Judith
 Donald Michael Kraig
 Paul Krassner
 Stanley Krippner
 Timothy Leary
 Deborah Lipp
 Louis Martinie'
 Terence McKenna
 M. Macha Nightmare
 Nema Andahadna
 Jonathan Ott
 Diana L. Paxson
 Harvey Pekar
 Christopher Penczak
 Lauren Raine
 Silver RavenWolf
 Nicki Scully
 R. U. Sirius
 Chas Smith
 Ivan Stang
 Harvey Wasserman
 Robert Anton Wilson
 Oberon Zell-Ravenheart
 Morning Glory Zell-Ravenheart

Featured entertainers 

 Sikiru Adepoju
 Babatunde Olatunji & Drums of Passion
 Baka Beyond
 Big Brother & the Holding Company
 Muruga Booker
 Chicago AfroBeat Project
 Cyro Baptista & Beat the Donkey
 Halim El-Dabh
 Gaelic Storm
 Michael Hinton
 JiMiller Band
 Stephen Kent
 Kenny & Tziporah Klein
 Jeff Magnus McBride
 Airto Moreira
 The Prodigals
 Raq
 Rainforest Band
 Badal Roy
 Tony Saunders
 Jim Scott
 Telesma
 Trance Mission

Notes

External links 
 

Modern pagan music festivals
Modern paganism in the United States
July events
World music festivals
Counterculture festivals
Music festivals established in 1981
1980s in modern paganism